Đulovac  (German: Wercke, Hungarian: Gjulaves, Gyula in Middle Ages) is a municipality in Slavonia, in the Bjelovar-Bilogora County of Croatia. There are 3,640 inhabitants, 79.5% of which are Croats.

History
In the late 19th and early 20th century, Đulovac was part of the Požega County of the Kingdom of Croatia-Slavonia.

Municipalities of Croatia
Populated places in Bjelovar-Bilogora County
Slavonia